The Taxi Driver (Greek: To soferaki) is a 1953 Greek comedy film directed by Yorgos Tzavellas and starring Mimis Fotopoulos, Smaroula Giouli, and Nikos Rizos.

Cast
 Mimis Fotopoulos as Vangos  
 Smaroula Giouli as Lela
 Nikos Rizos 
 Giorgos Vlahopoulos
 Sperantza Vrana 
 Thanasis Tzeneralis
 Lela Patrikiou
 Jenny Stavropoulou
 Giannis Ioannidis 
 Lola Filippidou
 Elsa Rizou
 Giorgos Loukakis
 Kostas Papahristos

References

Bibliography
 Vrasidas Karalis. A History of Greek Cinema. A&C Black, 2012.

External links
 

1953 films
1953 comedy films
1950s Greek-language films
Greek comedy films
Greek black-and-white films